Bal Narsingh Kunwar or Balanarsingh Kanwar (2 February 1783 -  24 December 1841) posthumously referred  as Bal Narsingh Kunwar Rana was a Kaji, military officer and governor in the Kingdom of Nepal.

He was born to Kaji Ranajit Kunwar of the Chhetri Kunwar family of Gorkha. He was the father of Jung Bahadur Rana, founder of the Rana dynasty. Bal Narsingh married Ganesh Kumari, daughter of Thapa Kaji Nain Singh Thapa and was related to Pandes through his mother-in-law Rana Kumari Pande, daughter of Mulkaji Ranajit Pande. He became a Kaji (minister of state) after he killed Sher Bahadur Shah, the assassin of King Rana Bahadur Shah. He served as governor of Dhankuta, Dadeldhura and Jumla.

Early life
He was born on 2 February 1783 to Governor of Jumla, Kaji Ranajit Kunwar, the only son of Sardar Ram Krishna Kunwar, a prominent General of King Prithvi Narayan Shah. He was second cousin to Captain Balbhadra Kunwar. He travelled to Banaras with his ally Bhimsen Thapa, Dalbhanjan Pande, Ranganath Poudyal, Chautariya Balbhadra Shah, when King Rana Bahadur Shah as Swami Maharaja set out to leave the country.

Bhandarkhal Night
On the night of 25 April 1806, King Rana Bahadur Shah held a courtier meeting at Kazi Tribhuvan Khawas's house during which he taunted and threatened to execute his half brother Chautariya Sher Bahadur. Bal Narsingh cut down the murderer Sher Bahadur when latter drew a sword in desperation at around 10 pm and killed the King. For this, he was awarded the hereditary post of Kaji by Bhimsen Thapa.

Life as Governor
He worked as Governor of Dhankuta (1828-1832), Governor of Dadeldhura (1833-1835) and Governor of Jumla (1835-1837).

Fall of Thapa clans

References

Books

Unification of Nepal
History of Nepal
1783 births
1841 deaths
19th century in Nepal
Gurkhas
People from Gorkha District
People of the Nepalese unification
19th-century Nepalese nobility
18th-century Nepalese nobility
Khas people